A Taste for Killing is a 1992 American made-for-television thriller drama film directed by Lou Antonio and starring Michael Biehn, Jason Bateman and Henry Thomas. It marked Renée Zellweger's film debut. The film was originally broadcast August 12, 1992 on USA Network.

Plot
Blaine Stockard III (Bateman) and Cary Sloan (Thomas) are best friends from well-to-do families who both set off for adventurous summer jobs on a Texas offshore oil rig between college graduation and law school. Openly resentful of their high society background, the boys' blue-collar bad-tempered boss Elray (Deckert) makes their lives as miserable as possible. Soon the boys meet happy-go-lucky Bo Landry (Biehn), who befriends the naive kids, shows them the ropes and helps them survive. The boys soon discover that their new friend is anything but a lifesaver. Preying on their innocence, Bo soon reveals himself as a con-artist with deadly intentions.

Cast
 Michael Biehn as Bo Landry
 Jason Bateman as Blaine Stockard III
 Henry Thomas as Cary Sloan
 Blue Deckert as Elray Phelps
 Renée Zellweger as Mary Lou
 Brandon Smith as Detective Grier
 Woody Watson as Detective Rutland
 Fred Lerner as Duane

References

External links
 

1992 films
1992 television films
1990s thriller drama films
American thriller drama films
Films scored by Mark Snow
Films set in Houston
Films shot in Houston
USA Network original films
Universal Pictures films
American thriller television films
1992 drama films
Films directed by Lou Antonio
American drama television films
1990s English-language films
1990s American films